St Thomas Strikers FC (aka. St Thomas/Trinity Strikers) are a football club from St. Kitts, currently playing in the Saint Kitts Premier Division (officially known as SKNFA Digicel Premier League). They are based in Old Road Town and the surrounding Trinity area.

External links 
 http://www.soccervista.com/team.php?teamid=165453
 http://sknfa.com

Football clubs in Saint Kitts and Nevis